Nicole Kreil (born 8 August 1965) is an Austrian diver. She competed in two events at the 1984 Summer Olympics.

References

External links
 

1965 births
Living people
Austrian female divers
Olympic divers of Austria
Divers at the 1984 Summer Olympics
Place of birth missing (living people)